Fanini is an Italian surname. Notable people with the surname include:

Edewin Fanini (born 1986), Italian Brazilian footballer
Michela Fanini (1973–1994), Italian racing cyclist

Italian-language surnames